Essen-Frohnhausen station is situated in Essen in western Germany. It is served by lines S1 and S3 of the Rhine-Ruhr S-Bahn.

History 
The Essen-Frohnhausen S-Bahn station was built with the introduction of the two S-Bahn lines on 26 May 1974. It was on the S1 line, initially running between Bochum and Duisburg-Großenbaum, and the S3, running between Oberhausen and Hattingen.

The southern platform track then, as now, serves trains towards Essen and the northern platform track serves trains towards Duisburg and Oberhausen.

Between them is double track without access to platforms, which forms part of the line to Essen-Borbeck, used by the Regional-Express service RE14 (Der Borkener), and S-Bahn line S9, which replaced the regional service N9, which ran until 1998.

Current situation 
The station is exclusively used by lines S1 and S3 of the Rhine-Ruhr S-Bahn (timetable routes 450.1 and 450.3).

It is classified by Deutsche Bahn as a category 4 station. The two platforms are both accessible from the east and from the west. To the north of the station there is a station parking area.

Transport services 
Currently, the station is served by line S 1 and S 3 of the Rhine-Ruhr S-Bahn.

References

S1 (Rhine-Ruhr S-Bahn)
S3 (Rhine-Ruhr S-Bahn)
Rhine-Ruhr S-Bahn stations
Frohnhausen
Railway stations in Germany opened in 1974
1974 establishments in West Germany